Jeannotte River is a river that rises in Lac Édouard in the municipality of Lac-Édouard in Haute-Mauricie, agglomerated with the city of La Tuque since 2003, in the administrative region of Mauricie, in the province of Quebec, Canada. The upper segment of the path of the Jeannotte River marks the Zec de la Bessonne and Zec Jeannotte, then the river flows through the Zec Jeannotte, incorporated in 1978.

Course
From "Lac de la grande baie" (Lake of the Great Bay) (adjacent to the southern part of Lake Edward) in Township Bickerdike, the Jeannotte River flows in the north-south direction in the wild and mountainous area near several small lakes (listed in order from head river):

a. Township Bickerdike:
 Lake Zoe.

b. Township Charest:
 Lake Orleans
 Lake of Peace
 Lake of the Beaten.

c. Township Laurier
 Beaver Lake, is formed very elongated, with a bulge in the river Jeannotte way
 Lake shortcut
 Belle Lake Trout
 Lake Bradley
 Lac au Lard,
 Lake Vermilion. Note: At this point, the Jeannotte river bifurcates of 90 degrees to head east toward the Batiscan River.

The last  of the river course are in the territory of Portneuf Wildlife Reserve. The upper river is normally navigable, only the last four kilometers include rapid considered more difficult for boating.

Major tributaries 

The main tributaries of the Jeannotte River are (starting from the head of the river):

Right bank:
 Outlet of Lake Shiragoo,
 Outlet of Lake Orleans,
 Vermillion River
 Discharge of the Beautiful Trout Lake,
 Bacon Creek Lake.

Left Bank:
 Outlet of Lake Zoe
 Discharge of Lake Dorval,
 Discharge of Lake Shortcut
 River of kidneys.

Toponymy 

The Jeannotte name originates from an aboriginal hunter of the parish of Batiscan, Edward Jeannotte, who accompanied the surveyor Joseph Bouchette (junior) on an expedition of recognition in the territories of Upper Mauricie in 1828, including their visit to Lake Edward. The name "Jeannotte River" was registered at the Commission de toponymie du Québec (Geographical Names Board of Quebec) on December 5, 1968.

Notes and references

See also 

Batiscanie
Batiscan River
List of rivers of Quebec

Rivers of Mauricie
Landforms of La Tuque, Quebec